Muratlı is a Turkish place name and it may refer to; 
Muratlı, a district in Tekirdağ Province
Muratlı, Borçka a village in Borçka district of Artvin Province
Muratlı, Dinar a village in Dinar district of Afyonkarahisar Province
Muratlı, Karacabey a village in Karacabey district of Bursa Province
Muratlı, Tarsus a village in Tarsus district of Mersin Province

See also
Muratlı Dam